The 1928 FA Charity Shield was the 15th FA Charity Shield, a football match between the winners of the previous season's First Division and FA Cup competitions. The match was contested by league champions Everton and FA Cup winners Blackburn Rovers, and was played at Old Trafford, in Manchester. Everton won the game, 2–1.

Match details

References

 

1928
Comm
Charity Shield 1928
Charity Shield 1928